Alkalilimnicola ehrlichii is a species of arsenite-oxidizing haloalkaliphilic gammaproteobacterium capable of chemoautotrophic or heterotrophic growth. It is Gram-negative, motile and short-rod-shaped. The type strain is MLHE-1T (=DSM 17681T =ATCC BAA-1101T).

References

Further reading

External links

LPSN
Type strain of Alkalilimnicola ehrlichii at BacDive -  the Bacterial Diversity Metadatabase

Chromatiales
Bacteria described in 2007